Kathleen is a 1941 American comedy-drama film starring Shirley Temple in her first comeback role since "retiring" from the screen a year earlier. It was the only movie she made for Metro-Goldwyn-Mayer.

Plot
Kathleen Davis (Shirley Temple) is a 12-year-old who lives in a big house with a nanny, a butler, maids, and no mother. Her father, John Davis (Herbert Marshall), spends most of his time at work, and has little time to spend with his daughter. She dreams of a traditional family, and tells her friends that she has such a family. Because of this fib, she cannot invite any friends to her home, as they would see the truth.

Kathleen and her nanny, Mrs. Farrell (Nella Walker), have a contentious relationship. Mr. Davis dismisses the nanny, and hires a psychologist named Dr. Angela Kent (Laraine Day) to look after the young girl for the summer. He has begun seeing a woman named Lorraine Bennett (Gail Patrick), whom he considers marrying. But Lorraine and Kathleen dislike each other intensely. Instead, Kathleen envisions Dr. Kent as the perfect mother for her, and wife for her father. When this seems unlikely, Kathleen runs away from home. After a confrontation with Lorraine and Dr. Kent, Mr. Davis decides that he, too, prefers the doctor. The film ends happily, as Kathleen is reunited with her father and his new fiancée, the doctor.

Cast

Reception
The film was not received well by critics. Theodore Strauss of The New York Times wrote that, "MGM, her new sponsors, haven't done right by our Shirley. Out of her indubitable charm they have created a vexatious, pucker-faced little brat full of sugary day dreams to make an audience wince. They have confronted her proven talents as an actress with stilted situations that even a Duse couldn't carry off. Assigned to a vehicle for Mistress Temple, the script writer seems to have become all thumbs." Variety called the film "tedious" and said that Temple "does not tee off auspiciously." John Mosher of The New Yorker wrote, "I must say that they have given the diva a disagreeable kind of vehicle for her resuscitation from private life ... Child psychologists may go to the film in groups and classes, but frivolous types will hope the child is not now, even so near her teens, going to make a specialty of problem pictures." Life wrote that Temple gave "a good performance in a pretty dull story."

References

External links
 
 
 
 
 

1941 films
1941 comedy-drama films
American black-and-white films
American comedy-drama films
Films directed by Harold S. Bucquet
Films scored by Franz Waxman
Metro-Goldwyn-Mayer films
1940s English-language films
1940s American films
English-language comedy-drama films